Kirill Mikhaylovich Sveshnikov (born 10 February 1992) is a Russian cyclist, who currently rides for UCI Continental team .

Major results

Track

2010
 UEC European Junior Championships
1st  Team pursuit
2nd  Madison
2nd  Points race
 UCI Junior Track World Championships
2nd  Madison
3rd  Points race
2011
 1st  Team pursuit, UEC European Under-23 Championships
 3rd  Madison, 2011–12 UCI Track Cycling World Cup, Astana (with Artur Ershov)
2012
 2011–12 UCI Track Cycling World Cup
1st  Scratch, Beijing
2nd  Points race, London
 2nd  Points race, UEC European Championships
2013
 3rd  Points race, UCI World Championships
2014
 2nd  Individual pursuit, UEC European Under-23 Championships
2018
 1st  Omnium, National Championships

Road

2009
 9th Road race, UCI Juniors World Championships
2014
 4th Gran Premio Industrie del Marmo
 6th Overall Troféu Joaquim Agostinho
1st  Young rider classification
1st Stage 2
 7th La Côte Picarde
2015
 9th Klasika Primavera
2016
 1st Stage 1b (TTT) Settimana Internazionale di Coppi e Bartali
2020
 6th Overall Tour of Mevlana

References

External links

1992 births
Living people
Russian male cyclists
Cyclists from Saint Petersburg
Cyclists at the 2016 Summer Olympics
Olympic cyclists of Russia